Francesco Oddo (born 24 August 1946) is an Italian football manager and former player.

Career
Born in Trapani, Sicily, but resident of Città Sant'Angelo, Abruzzo, Oddo started his coaching career in 1988 with Giulianova of the Serie C2 league. In 1990, he became head coach of Serie B club Avellino, successively managing several other teams from the same league such as Modena and Pescara. He made his debut in a Serie A coaching position during the 1995–96 season, with Reggiana, ending the season with an unfortunate relegation. He then had two other Serie A stints as head coach with Salernitana and Venezia, without any particularly impressive results. He later also coached Messina during the 2002–03 Serie B season.

Personal life
Francesco is the father of the former S.S. Lazio, A.C. Milan, Bayern Munich, and Italy right-back Massimo Oddo, who had a successful career both at club and international level, winning the 2006 FIFA World Cup and the 2006–07 UEFA Champions League, among other titles.

External links

1946 births
Living people
People from Trapani
Italian footballers
Italian football managers
A.C.R. Messina managers
U.S. Avellino 1912 managers
A.C. Reggiana 1919 managers
Delfino Pescara 1936 managers
Modena F.C. managers
Venezia F.C. managers
U.S. Salernitana 1919 managers
Association footballers not categorized by position
Footballers from Sicily
Footballers from Abruzzo
Sportspeople from the Province of Trapani
Sportspeople from the Province of Pescara